Hadrianopolis or Hadrianoupolis, was a town of ancient Epirus and Illyricum, founded by emperor Hadrian, and situated on the road from Apollonia to Nicopolis, about midway between those two towns. It was repaired and moved by Justinian I, and called Justinianopolis, and became one of the cities of the government of old Epirus and the see of a bishop. The small theatre and other vestiges in the plain below Libohovë mark the position of this city. Ten or twelve miles lower down the river are the ruins of a fortress or small town of the Byzantine age, called Dryinopolis. These remains are of a later age than the theatre, which belongs to Paganism. The probability is, that when Hadrianopolis fell into ruins Dryinopolis was built on a different site, and became the see of the bishop. Hadrianopolis in Epiro remains a titular see of the Roman Catholic Church.

Its site is located near Sofratikë, Dropull, in Albania.

References

Populated places in ancient Epirus
Former populated places in Albania
Hadrian
Ruins in Albania
Archaeological sites in Albania
Catholic titular sees in Europe